My Dad Wrote a Porno was a British comedy podcast hosted by Jamie Morton, James Cooper, and Alice Levine. Published from 4 October 2015 to 12 December 2022, each episode of the podcast featured Morton reading a new chapter of Belinda Blinked, an amateur erotic novel series written by his father under the pen name Rocky Flintstone. Morton, Cooper, and Levine react to the material and provide running commentary. Each episode featured Cooper and Levine hearing the chapter for the first time, whereas Morton had read the chapter beforehand to prepare.

During its run, the podcast was downloaded over 430 million times. On 11 May 2019, HBO aired a comedy special of the show which featured a "lost chapter" from one of the books. The special was filmed over two nights in front of a live audience at the Roundhouse theatre in London.

History
The podcast began on 4 October 2015 and is presented by television writer and director Jamie Morton, digital executive James Cooper, and television and radio presenter Alice Levine. The three originally met at the University of Leeds before they began working in broadcasting, and had previously worked together on other projects. The podcast originated at a family gathering for Morton's sister's birthday, where Morton's father took him into his study and handed him some chapters of a novel he had been writing under the pen name Rocky Flintstone in his garden shed (which Morton claims is because his mother won't let his father write it in the house). Morton realised with shock that he was reading the first chapter of his father's erotic novel, Belinda Blinked. He shared the chapter with friends at a Christmas lunch, where Levine suggested that they should create a podcast about it.

Morton played the My Dad Wrote a Porno pilot to his family, who were encouraging; while his mother initially found it disgusting, she was later fully supportive. The podcast recording usually took place informally in one of the hosts' houses and 90 minutes of recording is edited by Morton into one 40-minute episode. The podcast is hosted by Acast, which secures the advertising that funds the production. The advert is then scripted into the advertising section of the podcast and performed by the three presenters. The rest of the podcast is unscripted and spontaneous. Cooper and Levine have not heard the chapter before the recording, whereas Morton has read through it shortly before recording the episode to familiarise himself with the phrasing and prepare for any accents and characters he may have to adopt.

The podcast concluded on 12 December 2022, after six seasons. It was revealed by Flintstone during the final episode that the inspiration for the novel came from a conversation he had with his wife, with whom he had written many travel books; his wife mentioned that their books did not sell well, prompting him to remark that "the only thing that sells these days is sex". When his wife replied that she could not write erotica, he took it as a challenge to do it himself.

Belinda Blinked
Belinda Blinked is a genuine series of at least six books, three of which are available as self-published e-books for sale and download. As of 2017, Flintstone was working on the sixth book and has said he intends to continue as he "needs the money". The novels tell the story of the sexual exploits of Belinda Blumenthal and her work in the sales and marketing department of the fictional company Steeles Pots and Pans. Belinda's work takes her around the world, where she meets various sales reps, suppliers, and business associates. Many characters regularly appear throughout the series, although some are introduced only to never be heard from again, or even change name halfway through a chapter. The writing is erratic and Morton has said, "One moment Belinda is handcuffed to a trellis in a 'medium-sized maze', the next she's at a charity tombola raising funds for the Asses & Donkeys Trust."

The first four books were written and completed before the podcast began airing in 2015. The first was released in March 2015 under its full title: Belinda Blinked; 1 A modern story of sex, erotica and passion. How the sexiest sales girl in business earns her huge bonus by being the best at removing her high heels. The second followed in July 2016, entitled Belinda Blinked; 2 The continuing story of, dripping sex, passion and big business deals.: Keep following the sexiest sales girl in business as she earns her huge bonus by removing her silk blouse. The third was released in May 2017, called Belinda Blinked; 3: The continuing erotic story of sexual activity, dripping action and even bigger business deals as Belinda relentlessly continues to earn her huge bonus. The fourth was released in November 2018, called Belinda Blinked 4;: An erotic story of sexual prowess, sexy characters and even bigger business deals whilst the darkness increases;. The fifth book in the series was the first book written after the podcast premiered, and was released in December 2019 with the title Belinda Blinked 5: Belinda Blumenthal, worldwide Sales Director of Steeles Pots and Pans is in big trouble. Can the sexiest girl in sales continue to remove her brassiere whilst the evil grows. In November 2020, a special lockdown-themed book was released, set during the spring of 2020 during the COVID-19 pandemic and called Belinda Blinked; Lockdown 69: A very special Belinda Blinked book written during very unspecial times...

Rocky Flintstone 
"Rocky Flintstone" is the pen name of Morton's father, a retired Northern Irish builder. According to Flintstone, the name "Rocky" was inspired by The Rockford Files and a family friend's dog living in Brazil, also named Rocky. "Flintstone" is inspired by the author's degree in geology and his self-identification with Fred Flintstone as he batters on the door waiting to be allowed back indoors at the end of each Flintstones episode. Before retiring, Flintstone worked as a builder, teacher, and, like his protagonist, in sales. Prior to writing Belinda Blinked, Flintstone self-published a number of non-fiction works on subjects of his personal expertise, including a tourist's guide to Brazil, a mineral identification manual, and a gardening book. The Belinda Blinked series is his only known work of fiction. Flintstone prefers to remain out of the podcast spotlight.

Podcast guests
The podcast features "Footnotes" episodes which run concurrently with the series, in which they discuss aspects of the phenomenon and invite notable listeners to discuss Belinda Blinked, offer suggestions, and discuss potential film castings. Footnotes began with episodes featuring Flintstone's biography and questions from listeners. Guests have included Hayley Atwell, Ben Barnes, Rachel Bloom, Charlotte Crosby, George Ezra, Josh Groban, Nicholas Hoult, Dan Levy, Joe Lycett, Stephen Mangan, Thomas Middleditch, Lin-Manuel Miranda, Daisy Ridley, Michael Sheen, Emma Thompson, Samara Weaving, Mara Wilson, and Elijah Wood.

HBO special 
On 27 August 2018, it was announced that HBO had plans to produce a comedy special based on the live tour of My Dad Wrote A Porno. It features a "lost chapter" from one of the books, and has various segments, including audience participation and live reenactments. The special was filmed over two nights in front of a live audience at the Roundhouse theatre in London. The special aired on HBO on 11 May 2019, and in the UK on Sky Atlantic on 16 May.

Other media
The first series of My Dad Wrote a Porno was published as a book on 27 October 2016. It was designed as a spoof "study guide" with comments, annotations, character appraisals, key themes, and games provided by the hosts. In June 2017, a copy of the book signed by the hosts and Flintstone was auctioned as part of a fundraiser for the victims of the Grenfell Tower fire.

The My Dad Wrote a Porno live show has toured the UK, Ireland, New Zealand, Australia, Canada and the United States including the Edinburgh Festival Fringe in Scotland and Just For Laughs comedy festival in Canada. The live show was adapted into an HBO comedy special on 11 May 2019.

The team have also been approached about adapting the material into a film. Based on the "Footnotes" episodes the team have postulated, "Elijah Wood's playing the youngish man. Daisy Ridley's the Duchess. Michael Sheen's Dr. Robbins, he was very excited about that. Thomas Middleditch wanted to be Dr Robbins too, so they'll have to fight for that. Rachel Bloom in prosthetics wanted to be Jim Sterling."

Reception
The podcast initially ran into problems with its title, with iTunes refusing to list it and advertisers being reluctant to be involved.

As of 2020, the podcast has been downloaded over 250 million times. Dedicated fans are known as "Belinkers" and on Mondays, when a new episode is released, the hashtag #PornoDay trends on Twitter. My Dad Wrote a Porno has been cited in best UK podcasts lists compiled by GQ, Square Mile, The Guardian, Huffington Post, BuzzFeed, and Stuff.

The writing style has been described as "unerotic" and "hideous" (The Guardian), "unintentionally hilarious" and having an "extremely sketchy knowledge of female anatomy" (The Times), as well as "Shakespearesque" (Michael Sheen)
 
In 2016, My Dad Wrote a Porno was nominated for an Audio and Radio Industry Award (ARIAS) award in the category Podcast of the Year.

In 2017, it was nominated for a Webby award in the category Comedy (Podcasts & Digital Audio). Also in 2017, the series was nominated in the Listener Choice category of the British Podcast Awards and the 7th annual Lovie Awards presented by the International Academy of Digital Arts and Sciences.

The show also won the "Podcast Champion 2019" at the British Podcast Awards.

In 2019, My Dad Wrote a Porno won a Webby award in the Comedy category for Podcasts & Digital Audio.

References

External links
 

Comedy and humor podcasts
2015 podcast debuts
Works about literature
Works about sex
Audio podcasts
British podcasts